This article contains information about the literary events and publications of 1999.

Events
May 1 – Andrew Motion is appointed Poet Laureate of the United Kingdom for ten years.
June 19 – Stephen King is hit by a van while taking a walk. He is hospitalized for three weeks and only resumes writing his next book, On Writing, in July.
September 7 – Black Diamond, designed by Schmidt Hammer Lassen Architects, is inaugurated as an extension to the Royal Danish Library in Copenhagen.
unknown date – Persephone Books is founded in Bloomsbury, London, by Nicola Beauman, to reprint mid-20th century fiction and non-fiction, mainly by women.

New books

Fiction
Isabel Allende – Daughter of Fortune (Hija de la fortuna)
Aaron Allston
Solo Command
Starfighters of Adumar
Laurie Halse Anderson – Speak
Max Barry – Syrup
Greg Bear – Darwin's Radio
Raymond Benson
High Time to Kill
The World Is Not Enough
Maeve Binchy – Tara Road
Luther Blissett (pseudonym) – Q
François Bloemhof – Klipgooi
Xurxo Borrazás – O desintegrista
Ben Bova – Return to Mars
Terry Brooks – Star Wars: Episode I – The Phantom Menace
Thomas Brussig – Am kürzeren Ende der Sonnenallee
Bonnie Burnard – A Good House
Stephen Chbosky – The Perks of Being a Wallflower
Tracy Chevalier – Girl with a Pearl Earring
J. M. Coetzee – Disgrace
Matt Cohen – Elizabeth and After
Bernard Cornwell
Sharpe's Fortress
Stonehenge: A Novel of 2000 BC
Douglas Coupland – Miss Wyoming
Robert Crais – L.A. Requiem
Michael Crichton – Timeline
August Derleth (editor) – New Horizons
Marc Dugain – La Chambre des Officiers (The Officers' Ward)
Frederic S. Durbin – Dragonfly
Bret Easton Ellis – Glamorama
Per Olov Enquist – The Visit of the Royal Physician (Livläkarens besök)
Steve Erickson – The Sea Came in at Midnight
Sebastian Faulks – Charlotte Gray
Helen Fielding –  The Edge of Reason
Amanda Filipacchi – Vapor
Anna Gavalda – Je voudrais que quelqu'un m'attende quelque part
John Grisham – The Testament
Ha Jin (哈金) – Waiting
Joanne Harris – Chocolat
Thomas Harris – Hannibal
Ernest Hemingway – True at First Light
Carl Hiaasen – Sick Puppy
Stewart Home – Cunt
Michel Houellebecq – Atomised
Jerry B. Jenkins and Tim LaHaye – Soul Harvest
K. W. Jeter – Hard Merchandise
Lisa Jewell – Ralph's Party
Stephen King:
The Girl Who Loved Tom Gordon
Hearts in Atlantis
László Krasznahorkai – War and War
Jhumpa Lahiri – Interpreter of Maladies (short stories)
Joe R. Lansdale
Veil's Visit: a Taste of Hap and Leonard
Freezer Burn
John le Carré – Single & Single
Jonathan Lethem – Motherless Brooklyn
Ray Loriga – Tokio ya no nos quiere
Frank McCourt -'Tis
David Macfarlane – Summer Gone
Alistair MacLeod – No Great Mischief
Juliet Marillier – Daughter of the Forest
Alan Moore and Eddie Campbell – From Hell (graphic novel)
Jeffrey Moore – Prisoner in a Red-Rose Chain
Erwin Mortier – Marcel
Chuck Palahniuk
Invisible Monsters
Survivor
Tony Parsons – Man and Boy
Terry Pratchett – The Fifth Elephant
Kathy Reichs – Death du Jour
Matthew Reilly – Temple
Jennifer Roberson – Lady of Sherwood
Louis Sachar – Holes
R. A. Salvatore – Vector Prime
Margit Sandemo – Skattejakten
Neal Shusterman – Downsiders
Michael Slade – Burnt Bones
Susan Sontag – In America
Ahdaf Soueif – The Map of Love
Michael Stackpole – Isard's Revenge
Matthew Stadler – Allan Stein
Danielle Steel – Irresistible Forces
Neal Stephenson – Cryptonomicon
Francine Stock – A Foreign Country
Remy Sylado – Ca Bau Kan (The Courtesan)
Koushun Takami (高見 広春) – Battle Royale
Rose Tremain – Music and Silence
Miloš Urban – Sedmikostelí (The Seven Churches)
Andrew Vachss – Choice of Evil
Jane Vandenburgh – 'The Physics of SunsetVernor Vinge – A Deepness in the SkyJeanette Winterson – The World and Other PlacesTimothy Zahn – The Icarus HuntRoger Zelazny and Jane Lindskold – Lord DemonChildren and young people
David Almond – Kit's WildernessElizabeth Arnold – Spin of the SunwheelSusan Cooper – King of ShadowsJulia Donaldson (with Axel Scheffler) – The GruffaloNick Earls – 48 Shades of BrownMem Fox - Sleepy BearsBarbara Diamond Goldin – Journeys With Elijah: Eight Tales of the ProphetGerald Hausman (with Loretta Hausman and Barry Moser) – Dogs of Myth: Tales from Around the WorldSatoshi Kitamura – Me and My Cat?Adeline Yen Mah – Chinese Cinderella (autobiography)
Robert L. Millet (with James C. Christensen) – Parables and other Teaching StoriesJohn Nickle – The Ant BullyAndre Norton (with Martin H. Greenberg) – Catfantastic VIona Opie – Here Comes Mother GooseJerry Pinkney
 The Little Match Girl The Ugly DucklingLouise Rennison – Angus, Thongs and Full-Frontal SnoggingFaith Ringgold – If a Bus Could Talk: The Story of Rosa ParksJ. K. Rowling – Harry Potter and the Prisoner of AzkabanLemony SnicketThe Bad BeginningThe Reptile RoomJacqueline Wilson – The Illustrated MumSimms Taback – Joseph Had a Little OvercoatDrama
Jon Fosse – Dream of AutumnDavid Mamet – Boston MarriageFrank McGuinness – Dolly West's KitchenLars Norén – 7:3Mark O'Rowe – Howie the RookieÉric-Emmanuel Schmitt – Hôtel des deux mondesZlatko Topčić – RefugeesAugust Wilson – King Hedley IIPoetry

Iona Opie – Here Comes Mother GooseDejan Stojanović – Sunce sebe gleda (The Sun Watches Itself)

Non-fiction
Thomas Berry – The Great Work: Our Way into the FutureDavid Cairns – Berlioz: Volume 2, Servitude and Greatness 1832–1869Wayson Choy – Paper Shadows: A Chinatown ChildhoodThe Dalai Lama – Ancient Wisdom, Modern WorldSamuel R. Delany – Times Square Red, Times Square BlueLaurence des Cars – Les Préraphaélites : Un modernisme à l'anglaiseFreeman Dyson – The Sun, the Genome and the InternetKoenraad Elst – Update on the Aryan Invasion DebateNicholas Goodrick-Clarke – Paracelsus: Essential Readings.
John Steele Gordon – The Great Game: The Emergence of Wall Street as a World Power: 1653–2000Brian Greene – The Elegant UniverseDeborah Harkness – John Dee's Conversations with Angels: Cabala, Alchemy, and the End of NaturePeter Jennings and Todd Brewster – The CenturyS.T. Joshi – Sixty Years of Arkham HouseWinona LaDuke – All our Relations: Native Struggles for Land and Life 
Bruce Lincoln – Theorizing Myth: Narrative, Ideology, and ScholarshipJamie Oliver – The Naked ChefW. G. Sebald – Luftkrieg und Literatur (Air War and Literature, translated as On the Natural History of Destruction)
David Southwell – Conspiracy TheoriesDejan Stojanović – Razgovori (Conversations)
Jean-Pierre Vernant – L'univers, les dieux, les hommesBirths
October 13 – Faridah Àbíké-Íyímídé, Nigerian–British author and columnist
December 22 – Ameer Idreis, Canadian writer

Deaths
January 11 – Naomi Mitchison, Scottish novelist and poet (born 1897)
January 16 – Dadie Rylands (George Rylands), English Shakespearean scholar (born 1902)
February 8 – Iris Murdoch, Irish-born novelist and philosopher (born 1919) 
February 20 – Sarah Kane, English playwright (suicide, born 1971)
February 22 – William Bronk, American poet (born 1918)
February 24 – Andre Dubus, American short story writer, essayist and autobiographer (born 1936)
March 4
 Del Close, American actor, writer, and teacher (born 1934) 
 Karel van het Reve, Dutch writer (born 1921)
March 5 – John Figueroa, Jamaican poet (born 1920)
March 8 – Adolfo Bioy Casares, Argentine author (born 1914)
March 13 
 Lee Falk, American cartoonist, writer, theater director, and producer (born 1911)
 Garson Kanin, American playwright and screenwriter (born 1912)
March 28 – Jim Turner, American editor (born 1945)
April 13 – Knut Hauge, Norwegian novelist, dramatist and children's writer (born 1911)
May 8 – Soeman Hs, Indonesian novelist (born 1904)
May 10 – Shel Silverstein, American children's poet (born 1930)
May 27 – Alice Adams, short story writer and novelist (born 1926)
June 14 – J. F. Powers, American writer (born 1917)
July 2 – Mario Puzo, American writer (born 1920)
July 14 – Maria Banuș, Romanian poet and translator (born 1914)
September 25 – Marion Zimmer Bradley, American writer (born 1930)
October 3 – Heinz G. Konsalik, German novelist (born 1921)
October 19
Penelope Mortimer, Welsh-born English novelist and biographer (born 1918)
Nathalie Sarraute, Russian-born French writer and lawyer (born 1900)
E. J. Scovell, English poet (born 1907)
November 11 – Jacobo Timerman, Soviet-born Argentinian journalist and publisher (born 1923)
November 18 – Paul Bowles, American novelist (born 1910)
December 2 – Matt Cohen, Canadian novelist (born 1942)
December 8 – Rupert Hart-Davis, English editor and publisher (born 1907)
December 12 – Joseph Heller, American novelist (born 1923)

Awards
Nobel Prize for Literature: Günter Grass
Camões Prize: Sophia de Mello Breyner

Australia
The Australian/Vogel Literary Award: Hsu-Ming Teo, Love and VertigoC. J. Dennis Prize for Poetry: Gig Ryan, Pure and AppliedKenneth Slessor Prize for Poetry: Lee Cataldi, Race Against TimeMiles Franklin Award: Murray Bail, EucalyptusCanada
Giller Prize for Canadian Fiction: Bonnie Burnard, A Good HouseSee 1999 Governor General's Awards for a complete list of winners and finalists for those awards.
Edna Staebler Award for Creative Non-Fiction: Michael Poole, Romancing Mary JaneFrance
Prix Femina: Maryline Desbiolles, Prix Goncourt: Jean Echenoz, Prix Décembre: Claude Askolovitch, Prix Médicis French: Michel Del Castillo, Prix Médicis Non-Fiction: Christian Oster, Prix Médicis International: Bjorn Larsson, United Kingdom
Booker Prize: J. M. Coetzee, DisgraceCarnegie Medal for children's literature: Aidan Chambers, Postcards from No Man's LandJames Tait Black Memorial Prize for fiction: Timothy Mo, Renegade, or Halo2James Tait Black Memorial Prize for biography: Kathryn Hughes, George Eliot: The Last VictorianCholmondeley Award: Vicki Feaver, Geoffrey Hill, Elma Mitchell, Sheenagh Pugh
Eric Gregory Award: Ross Cogan, Matthew Hollis, Helen Ivory, Andrew Pidoux, Owen Sheers, Dan Wyke
Orange Prize for Fiction: Suzanne Berne, A Crime in the NeighborhoodSamuel Johnson Prize (first award): Antony Beevor, StalingradWhitbread Best Book Award: Seamus Heaney, BeowulfUnited States
Agnes Lynch Starrett Poetry Prize: Daisy Fried, She Didn't Mean To Do ItAiken Taylor Award for Modern American Poetry: George Garrett
Arthur Rense Prize awarded to James McMichael by the American Academy of Arts and Letters
Bernard F. Connors Prize for Poetry: J. D. McClatchy, "Tattoos"
Compton Crook Award: James Stoddard, The High HouseFrost Medal: Barbara Guest
Hugo Award for Best Novel: Connie Willis, To Say Nothing of the DogNational Book Award for Fiction: to Waiting by Ha Jin
National Book Critics Circle Award: to Motherless Brooklyn by Jonathan Lethem
Nebula Award: Octavia E. Butler, Parable of the TalentsNewbery Medal for children's literature: Louis Sachar, HolesPEN/Faulkner Award for Fiction: to The Hours by Michael Cunningham
Pulitzer Prize for Drama: Margaret Edson, WitPulitzer Prize for Fiction: Michael Cunningham, The HoursPulitzer Prize for Poetry: Mark Strand, Blizzard of OneWallace Stevens Award: Jackson Mac Low
Whiting Awards:
Fiction: Ehud Havazelet, Ben Marcus, Yxta Maya Murray, ZZ Packer
Nonfiction: Gordon Grice, Margaret Talbot
Plays: Naomi Iizuka
Poetry: Michael Haskell, Terrance Hayes, Martha Zweig

Elsewhere
Finlandia Prize: 1999 Kristina Carlson, Maan ääreenInternational Dublin Literary Award: Andrew Miller, Ingenious PainAlfaguara Prize: Manuel Vicent, Son de marPremio Nadal: Gustavo Martín Zarzo, Las historias de Marta y FernandoViareggio Prize: Ernesto Franco, Vite senza fine''

Notes

References

External links

 
Literature
Years of the 20th century in literature